Pieve di Teco is a comune (municipality) in the Province of Imperia in the Italian region Liguria, located about  southwest of Genoa and about  northwest of Imperia. 
 
Pieve di Teco borders the following municipalities: Armo, Aurigo, Borghetto d'Arroscia, Borgomaro, Caprauna, Caravonica, Cesio, Pornassio, Rezzo, and Vessalico.

Twin towns — sister cities
Pieve di Teco is twinned with:

  Bagnols-en-Forêt, France, since 1990

People
Mario Magnotta (1942-2009)

References

External links

Official website

Cities and towns in Liguria